Lev Dmitrievich Gudkov (6 December 1946 in Moscow) is a Russian sociologist, director of the analytical Levada Center and editor-in-chief of the journal The Russian Public Opinion Herald.

Scientific activity
Gudkov studied journalism, sociology and philology at the Lomonosov Moscow State University and graduated in 1971. He continued his post-graduate studies at the Institute for philosophy of the Russian Academy of Sciences until 1977. His dissertation concerned the Max Weber's concept of the methodology of social sciences and the German tradition of the understanding sociology. In 1995 Gudkov did his doctor in philosophy.

From 1970 to 1973 he worked for the department of methodology of researching social processes at the Russian Academy of Sciences.

In the following four years until 1977, Gudkov was an employee of the department of philosophy and sociology at the Institute for scientific Information on social studies which belongs to the Russian Academy of Sciences.

From 1977 to 1984 he was a senior researcher of the Sociology Department at the Russian State Library.

Between 1984 and 1986 he worked as one of the leading scientific employees at the Sociology Department of the Design Research Institute (VNIIITE).

In the following two years until 1988, Gudkov was the senior scientific employee of the All-Union book chamber.

In 1988 Gudkov started working for VCIOM, and became one of the leading scientists of the research center after a short while. Three years later in 1991, Gudkov was made the head of the theory- and later the sociopolitical department of researches at VCIOM.

Gudkov participated in all research projects at VCIOM during the period when the centre was administrated by Yuri Levada, such as

“The Soviet person from 1989 to 2003”
"Bureaucracy"
“Russian nationalism”
“Results of a year: The society from 1989 to 2003”

Work at the Levada Center
When in 2003 internal problems appeared at VCIOM, Gudkov left the organization together with Yuri Levada and the majority of employees to work for Yuri Levada's newly founded Analytical centre (Levada Center).

After the death of Yuri Levada in 2006, Gudkov was assigned to the post of the director of the Levada Center. He was selected for this position by a unanimous decision of the board of the centre. Since December 2006 Gudkov also works as the editor-in-chief of the magazine The Russian Public Opinion Herald which is regularly published by the Levada Center.

Besides his work at the different institutions, Gudkov also works as a professor. In 1994 he lectured sociology at the Jewish University of Moscow. From 1996 to 2004 and in 2006, he was a lecturer in sociology at the Russian State University for the Humanities. Additionally from 2005–2007 he gave lecture and seminars on the topic “Russia – a transitional society? - Cultural and institutional factors of socio-political conservatism in post-Soviet Russia” at the department of Political Science at the Moscow School of Social and Economic Sciences.

Publications
Gudkov is the author of several books and articles considering the theory and methodology of sociology, sociology of literature, ethnonational relations and social problems of the Post-Soviet society, including:

Lev Gudkov. Metafora i ratsionalnost' v perspektive socialnoi epistemologii. Moscow, 1994 (Metapher and rationality as the problem for social epistemology ).
Lev Gudkov, Boris Dubin. Intelligentsia. Moscow-Kharkov, 1995
Lev Gudkov, Boris Dubin. Literatura kak socialnyi institut. Moscow (Literature as social institute) Moscow, NLO, 1995
Gudkov, L. and Levinson, A. Attitudes Toward Jews in the Soviet Union: Public Opinion in Ten Republics. New York: American Jewish Committee, 1993
Gudkov, L. and Levinson, A. Attitudes toward Jews in the Commonwealth of Intependent States. New York: American Jewish Committee, 1994
Prostoi sovetskii chelovek: Opyt socialnogo portreta na rubezhe 1990 godov. Moskva, 1993 (in co-auth. with Yu. Lewada, B. Dubin, A. Levinson and N. Zorkaja): (German translation: Die Sowjetmenschen: Soziogramm eines Zerfalls, 1989-1991. B., Argon, 1992.)
Gudkov L, Dubin B. Obtschestvennyi dogovor v Rossii (Social contract in Russia). Sociological survey. Moscow, 2001.,
“Russia — A Society in Transition? ”. Telos 120 (Summer 2001). New York: Telos Press.
La Russia postcomunista. Da Gorbaciov a Putin. Luiss University Press, 2005, 181 p.
Gudkov L., Dubin B., Lewada Yu. Problema elity v sovremennoi Rossii (Problem of Elites in contemporary Russia), Moscow, 2007

References

External links
The Accidental Russiphile — an interview of Lev Gudkov to the Novye Izvestia (In English) August 2007
Lev Gudkov at Pipl Profile — bibliography and facts about Lev Gudkov
Lev Gudkov at Eurozine — Author's page at Eurozine
Presidential Election: The Russian attitudes and the opportunities to make a choice by Lev Gudkov and Boris Dubin

1946 births
Living people
Academic staff of Moscow State University
Moscow State University alumni
Academic staff of the Higher School of Economics
Writers from Moscow
Russian sociologists
Soviet scientists